Musa Sultanovich Mazayev (born 21 April 1977) is a former Russian professional footballer.

Club career
He made his debut in the Russian Premier League in 2005 for FC Terek Grozny, and played 4 games in the UEFA Cup 2004–05 for them.

Honours
 Russian Cup winner: 2004.
 Russian Second Division Zone South top scorer: 2002 (26 goals).

References

1977 births
Living people
Russian footballers
Association football midfielders
FC Akhmat Grozny players
FC Angusht Nazran players
Russian Premier League players